Stefanie Köhle (born 6 June 1986) is a former World Cup alpine ski racer from Austria.

Born in Zams, Tyrol, Köhle made her World Cup debut in Sölden in October 2007 and attained her first podium in October 2012 in Giant Slalom, also at Sölden. She retired from competition in April 2014.

World Cup results

Season standings

Race podiums

 1 podium – (1 GS)

References

External links
 
 Stefanie Koehle World Cup standings at the International Ski Federation
 
 Stefanie Koehle at Völkl Skis

Austrian female alpine skiers
1986 births
Living people
People from Zams
Sportspeople from Tyrol (state)